Vaqfi (also Romanized as Vaqfī) is a village in Miankuh Rural District, Miankuh District, Ardal County, Chaharmahal and Bakhtiari Province, Iran. At the 2006 census, its population was 75, in 16 families.

References 

Populated places in Ardal County